Andrea Rose Garae-Tari (born 28 June 1973) is a Vanuatuan athlete.

Garae competed at the 1992 Summer Olympics held in Barcelona, she entered the 800 metres where she finished 7th in her heat so did not qualify for the next round.

References

External links
 

1973 births
Living people
Vanuatuan female middle-distance runners
Athletes (track and field) at the 1992 Summer Olympics
Olympic athletes of Vanuatu